List of threatened and endangered arthropods, including insects, arachnids, and crustaceans under the United States Endangered Species Act as of October 2013.

Key to Listing Status codes:   
E - Endangered. An animal or plant species in danger of extinction throughout all or a significant portion of its range. 
T - Threatened. An animal or plant species likely to become endangered within the foreseeable future throughout all or a significant portion of its range.  
SAE or  SAT - Listed as Endangered or Threatened due to similarity of appearance. A species may be treated as endangered or threatened if it resembles in appearance a species which has been listed and enforcement personnel would have difficulty distinguishing between the listed and the unlisted species; if the effect of this difficulty is an additional threat to the listed species; and if such treatment of the unlisted species would improve protection for the listed species.

See also
Endangered arthropods
United States Fish and Wildlife Service list of endangered species of mammals and birds
Conservation biology

References

External links
U.S. Fish & Wildlife Service Endangered Species website
 The Xerces Society for Invertebrate Conservation

.
United States Fish and Wildlife Service list, arthropods
02
Arthropods, Endangered
United States
United States
E, arthropods